Princess Ishi-hime (? – after 572) was Empress of Japan as the consort of Emperor Kinmei.

She was Emperor Senka's daughter.

First son: 
Second son: , later Emperor Bidatsu

Notes

Japanese empresses
Year of death missing
6th-century Japanese women
Japanese princesses